Hædde (died 705) was a medieval monk and Bishop of Winchester.

Life
Hædde is believed to have been born in Headingley, Leeds, and became a monk of Whitby Abbey.
He became bishop in 676 and died about 7 July 705, although the Anglo-Saxon Chronicle states that he died in 703. In the law code of King Ine of Wessex, the bishop is mentioned as contributing to the laws. After his death, he was revered as a saint with a feast day of 7 July, and his large diocese was split in two, part of the area forming the Diocese of Sherborne.

Notes

Citations

References

External links
 
 Patron Saints Index: Hedda

7th-century births
705 deaths
Northumbrian saints
West Saxon saints
Bishops of Winchester
People from Headingley
Yorkshire saints
8th-century Christian saints
8th-century English bishops
Year of birth unknown